Elections to West Wiltshire District Council were held on 6 May 1999.  The whole council was up for election and the Liberal Democrats held their overall control, winning twenty-seven seats while the Conservatives took ten, Independents four and the Labour Party two.

Three single-member wards, Ethandune, Melksham Roundpond, and Westbrook, had only one candidate in each case and thus were uncontested.

Results

|}

Ward results

Blackmore Forest

Bradford-on-Avon North

Bradford-on-Avon South

Corsley

Dilton Marsh

Ethandune

Holt

Manor Vale

Melksham Forest

Melksham Lambourne

Melksham Roundpond

Melksham Town

Melksham Woodrow

Mid Wylye Valley

Paxcroft

Shearwater

Summerham

Trowbridge Adcroft

Trowbridge College

Trowbridge Drynham

Trowbridge John of Gaunt

Trowbridge Park

Warminster East

Warminster West

Weavers

Westbrook

Westbury with Storridge

Wylye Valley

References
Sue Bonham-Lovett, District and Parish Elections 6 May 1999: Report of the Returning Officer, report to West Wiltshire District Council Annual Meeting on 19 May 1999, Agenda Item no. 11, published 14 May 1999, available at Wiltshire and Swindon Archives. 

1999
1999 English local elections
1990s in Wiltshire